Cobblestone Railroad Pumphouse is a historic pumphouse located at the hamlet of Fishers in the town of Victor in Ontario County, New York. It was constructed about 1845 by the Auburn and Rochester Railroad and is a small cobblestone structure. It is built of relatively large, rough variously colored field cobbles. It is one of approximately 101 cobblestone buildings in Ontario County.

It was listed on the National Register of Historic Places in 1992.

References

Industrial buildings and structures on the National Register of Historic Places in New York (state)
Cobblestone architecture
Transport infrastructure completed in 1845
Buildings and structures in Ontario County, New York
National Register of Historic Places in Ontario County, New York